Sucesso do Inconsciente (Portuguese for "Success of the Unconscious") is the fourth studio album by Brazilian new wave band João Penca e Seus Miquinhos Amestrados. It was released in 1989 by independent label Esfinge.

The album spawned the hit single "Matinê no Rian", which would be used as the opening theme of the telenovela O Sexo dos Anjos. Paula Toller of Kid Abelha fame provides additional vocals for this track.

Background
"Matinê no Rian" references the Cinema Rian, a famous now-defunct movie theater in Rio de Janeiro which was founded by then-First Lady of Brazil Nair de Tefé in 1932 and demolished in 1983.

"S.O.S. Miquinhos" is a medley (or, as João Penca puts it, "merdley", a portmanteau of "merda" — the Portuguese word for "shit" — and "medley") comprising the tracks "Namoradinha de um Amigo Meu" (a parody of Roberto Carlos' eponymous song), "Esperto É o Coqueiro", "Certo ou Errado", "Rua Augusta", "Vem Quente que Eu Estou Fervendo" and a cover of Christie's "Yellow River".

Covers/parodies

Every João Penca album features Portuguese-language covers/parodies of old 1940s/1950s rock and roll/rockabilly and 1960s surf music songs.

"Johnny Pirou"
A parody of Chuck Berry's "Johnny B. Goode".

"O Monstro Macho"
A parody of Boris Pickett and the Crypt-Kickers' "Monster Mash".

Track listing

Personnel
João Penca e Seus Miquinhos Amestrados
 Selvagem Big Abreu (Sérgio Ricardo Abreu) — vocals, electric guitar
 Avellar Love (Luís Carlos de Avellar Júnior) — vocals, bass
 Bob Gallo (Marcelo Ferreira Knudsen) — vocals, drums

Guest musicians
 Paula Toller — female vocals in "Matinê no Rian"
 Léo Jaime — vocals in "Namoradinha de um Amigo Meu"

Miscellaneous staff
 Júnior Mendes — production

References

1989 albums
Portuguese-language albums
João Penca e Seus Miquinhos Amestrados albums